Democratic socialism is a left-wing political philosophy that supports political democracy and some form of a socially owned economy, with a particular emphasis on economic democracy, workplace democracy, and workers' self-management within a market socialist economy or an alternative form of a decentralised planned socialist economy. Democratic socialists argue that capitalism is inherently incompatible with the values of freedom, equality, and solidarity and that these ideals can only be achieved through the realisation of a socialist society. Although most democratic socialists seek a gradual transition to socialism, democratic socialism can support revolutionary or reformist politics to establish socialism. Democratic socialism was popularised by socialists who opposed the backsliding towards a one-party state in the Soviet Union and other nations during the 20th century.

The history of democratic socialism can be traced back to 19th-century socialist thinkers across Europe and the Chartist movement in Britain, which somewhat differed in their goals but shared a common demand for democratic decision-making and public ownership of the means of production and viewed these as fundamental characteristics of the society they advocated for. From the late 19th to the early 20th century, democratic socialism was heavily influenced by the gradualist form of socialism promoted by the British Fabian Society and Eduard Bernstein's evolutionary socialism in Germany. Democratic socialism is what most socialists understand by the concept of socialism; it may be broad (socialists who reject a one-party Marxist–Leninist state) or a more limited concept (post-war social democracy). As a broad movement, it includes forms of libertarian socialism, market socialism, reformist socialism, revolutionary socialism, ethical socialism, liberal socialism, social democracy, and some forms of state socialism and utopian socialism, all of which share a commitment to democracy.

Democratic socialism is contrasted with Marxism–Leninism, which opponents often perceive as being authoritarian, bureaucratic, and undemocratic in practice. Democratic socialists oppose the Stalinist political system and the Soviet-type economic planning system, rejecting as their form of governance the administrative-command system formed in the Soviet Union and other Marxist–Leninist states during the 20th century. Democratic socialism is also distinguished from Third Way social democracy because democratic socialists are committed to the systemic transformation of the economy from capitalism to socialism, while social democrats use capitalism to create a strong welfare state, leaving many businesses under private ownership. However, many democratic socialists also advocate for state regulations and welfare programs in order to reduce the perceived harms of capitalism and slowly transform the economic system.

While having socialism as a long-term goal, some moderate democratic socialists are more concerned about curbing capitalism's excesses and are supportive of progressive reforms to humanise it in the present day. In contrast, other democratic socialists believe that economic interventionism and similar policy reforms aimed at addressing social inequalities and suppressing capitalism's economic contradictions would only exacerbate them, causing them to emerge under a different guise. Those democratic socialists believe that the fundamental issues with capitalism are systemic and can only be resolved by replacing the capitalist mode of production with the socialist mode of production through the replacement of private ownership with collective ownership of the means of production and extending democracy to the economic sphere in the form of industrial democracy. The main criticism of democratic socialism is focused on the compatibility of democracy and socialism. Several academics and political commentators tend to distinguish between authoritarian socialism and democratic socialism as a political ideology, with the first representing the Soviet Bloc and the latter representing the democratic socialist parties in the Western Bloc countries that have been democratically elected in countries such as Britain, France, and Sweden, among others. However, following the end of the Cold War, many of these countries have moved away from socialism as a neoliberal consensus replaced the social democratic consensus in the advanced capitalist world.

Overview 

Democratic socialism is defined as having a socialist economy in which the means of production are socially and collectively owned or controlled alongside a liberal democratic political system of government. Democratic socialists reject most self-described socialist states and Marxism–Leninism. British Labour Party politician Peter Hain classifies democratic socialism and libertarian socialism as a form of anti-authoritarian socialism from below (using the concept popularised by American socialist activist Hal Draper) in contrast to authoritarian socialism and state socialism. For Hain, this authoritarian and democratic divide is more important than that between reformists and revolutionaries. In democratic socialism, the active participation of the population and workers in the self-management of the economy characterises socialism. Centralised economic planning coordinated by the state and nationalisation does not represent socialism. Nicos Poulantzas makes a similar, more complex argument. For Draper, revolutionary-democratic socialism is a type of socialism from below, writing in The Two Souls of Socialism that "the leading spokesman in the Second International of a revolutionary-democratic Socialism-from-Below was Rosa Luxemburg, who so emphatically put her faith and hope in the spontaneous struggle of a free working class that the myth-makers invented for her a 'theory of spontaneity.'" Similarly, he wrote about Eugene V. Debs that "'Debsian socialism' evoked a tremendous response from the heart of the people, but Debs had no successor as a tribune of revolutionary-democratic socialism."

Some Marxist socialists emphasise Karl Marx's belief in democracy and call themselves democratic socialists. The Socialist Party of Great Britain and the World Socialist Movement define socialism in its classical formulation as a "system of society based upon the common ownership and democratic control of the means and instruments for producing and distributing wealth by and in the interest of the community." Additionally, they include classlessness, statelessness and the abolition of wage labour as characteristics of a socialist society, characterising it as a stateless, propertyless, post-monetary economy based on calculation in kind, a free association of producers, workplace democracy and free access to goods and services produced solely for use and not for exchange. Although these characteristics are usually reserved to describe a communist society, this is consistent with the usage of Marx, Friedrich Engels and others, who referred to communism and socialism interchangeably.

Definition 
As a democratic socialist definition, the political scientist Lyman Tower Sargent states:

Another example is the Democratic Socialists of America (DSA), with the organisation defining democratic socialism as a decentralised socially-owned economy and rejecting centralised, Soviet-type economic planning, stating:

The DSA has been critical of self-described socialist states, arguing that "[j]ust because their bureaucratic elites called them 'socialist' did not make it so; they also called their regimes 'democratic.'" While ultimately committed to instituting socialism, the DSA focuses the bulk of its political activities on reforms within capitalism, arguing: "As we are unlikely to see an immediate end to capitalism tomorrow, DSA fights for reforms today that will weaken the power of corporations and increase the power of working people."

Labour Party politician Peter Hain, who identifies with libertarian socialism, gives the following definition:

Tony Benn, another prominent left-wing Labour Party politician, described democratic socialism as socialism that is "open, libertarian, pluralistic, humane and democratic; nothing whatever in common with the harsh, centralised, dictatorial and mechanistic images which are purposely presented by our opponents and a tiny group of people who control the mass media in Britain."

Democratic socialism sometimes represents policies within capitalism instead of an ideology that aims to transcend and replace capitalism, although this is not always the case. Robert M. Page, a reader in Democratic Socialism and Social Policy at the University of Birmingham, wrote about transformative democratic socialism to refer to the politics of Labour Party Prime Minister Clement Attlee and its government (fiscal redistribution, some degree of public ownership and a strong welfare state) and revisionist democratic socialism as developed by Labour Party politician Anthony Crosland and Labour Party Prime Minister Harold Wilson, arguing:

The Socialist International, of which almost all democratic socialist, labourist and social democratic parties are members, declares the goal of the development of democratic socialism. Some tendencies of democratic socialism advocate for a social revolution to transition to socialism, distinguishing it from some forms of social democracy. In Soviet politics, democratic socialism is the version of the Soviet Union model reformed democratically. Soviet leader Mikhail Gorbachev described perestroika as building a "new, humane and democratic socialism." Consequently, some former communist parties have rebranded themselves as democratic socialists. This includes parties such as The Left in Germany, a party succeeding the Party of Democratic Socialism, which was itself the legal successor of the Socialist Unity Party of Germany.

Democratic socialism and social democracy 
Democratic socialism has occasionally been described as the form of social democracy prior to the displacement of Keynesianism by neoliberalism and monetarism, which caused many social-democratic parties to adopt the Third Way ideology, accepting capitalism as the current status quo and powers that be, redefining socialism in a way that it maintained the capitalist structure intact. The new version of Clause IV of the Labour Party Constitution, adopted by Tony Blair, uses democratic socialism to describe a modernised form of social democracy. While affirming a commitment to democratic socialism, it no longer commits the party to public ownership of industry and, in its place, advocates "the enterprise of the market and the rigour of competition" along with "high quality public services ... either owned by the public or accountable to them." Much like modern social democracy, some forms of democratic socialism follow a gradual, reformist or evolutionary path to socialism rather than a revolutionary one. This tendency is captured in the statement of Labour revisionist Anthony Crosland, who argued that the socialism of the pre-war world was now becoming increasingly irrelevant. This tendency is invoked in an attempt to distinguish democratic socialism from Marxist–Leninist socialism, as in Norman Thomas' Democratic Socialism: A New Appraisal, Roy Hattersley's Choose Freedom: The Future of Democratic Socialism, Malcolm Hamilton's Democratic Socialism in Britain and Sweden, Jim Tomlinson's Democratic Socialism and Economic Policy: The Attlee Years, 1945–1951 and Donald F. Busky's Democratic Socialism: A Global Survey. A variant of this set of definitions is Joseph Schumpeter's argument in Capitalism, Socialism and Democracy (1942) that liberal democracies were evolving from liberal capitalism into democratic socialism with the growth of industrial democracy, regulatory institutions and self-management.

Democratic socialism has some degree of significant overlaps on practical policy positions with social democracy, although they are often distinguished from each other. Keynesian policies commonly supported by democratic socialists include significant economic regulation alongside a mixed economy, extensive social insurance schemes, generous public pension programs and a gradual expansion of public ownership over strategic industries. Many nations like Canada have policies like free universal healthcare.  Policies such as free, universal health care and education are described as "pure Socialism" because they are opposed to "the hedonism of capitalist society." Partly because of this overlap, some political commentators occasionally use the terms interchangeably. One difference is that modern social democrats tend to reject revolutionary means accepted by more radical socialists. Another difference is that social democrats are mainly concerned with practical reforms within capitalism, with socialism either relegated to the indefinite future or perceived to have abandoned it in the case of the Third Way. More radical democratic socialists want to go beyond mere meliorist reforms and advocate the systemic transformation of the mode of production from capitalism to socialism.

While the Third Way has been described as a new social democracy or neo-social democracy, standing for a modernised social democracy and competitive socialism, the form of social democracy that remained committed to the gradual abolition of capitalism and social democrats opposed to the Third Way merged into democratic socialism. During the late 20th century and early 21st century, these labels were embraced, contested and rejected due to the development within the European left of Eurocommunism between the 1970s and 1980s, the rise of neoliberalism in the mid to late 1970s, the fall of the Soviet Union in December 1991 and of Marxist–Leninist governments between 1989 and 1992, the rise and fall of the Third Way between the 1970s and 2010s and the simultaneous rise of anti-austerity, green, left-wing populist and Occupy movements in the late 2000s and early 2010s due to the global financial crisis of 2007–2008 and the Great Recession, the causes of which have been widely attributed to the neoliberal shift and deregulation economic policies. This latest development contributed to the rise of politicians that represent a return to the post-war consensus social democracy, such as Jeremy Corbyn in the United Kingdom and Bernie Sanders in the United States, who assumed the democratic socialist label to describe their rejection of centrist politicians that supported triangulation within the Labour and Democratic parties such as with New Labour and the New Democrats, respectively.

Social democracy originated as a revolutionary socialist or communist movement. One distinction to separate the modern versions of democratic socialism and social democracy is that the former can include revolutionary means. In contrast, the latter asserts that the only acceptable constitutional form of government is representative democracy under the rule of law. Many social democrats "refer to themselves as socialists or democratic socialists", and some "use or have used these terms interchangeably." Others argue that "there are clear differences between the three terms, and preferred to describe their own political beliefs by using the term 'social democracy' only." In political science, democratic socialism and social democracy are occasionally seen as synonyms and overlapping or otherwise not mutually exclusive, while they are distinguished in journalistic use, in most cases, sharply. While social democrats continue to call and describe themselves as democratic socialists or simply socialists, the meaning of democratic socialism and social democracy effectively reversed. Democratic socialism originally represented socialism achieved by democratic means and usually resulted in reformism, whereas social democracy included reformist and revolutionary wings. With the association of social democracy as a policy regime and the development of the Third Way, social democracy became almost exclusively associated with capitalist welfare states, while democratic socialism came to include communist and revolutionary tendencies.

Political party 
While most social-democratic parties describe themselves as democratic socialists, with democratic socialism representing the theory and social democracy the practice and vice versa, political scientists distinguish between the two. Social democratic is used for centre-left political parties, "whose aim is the gradual amelioration of poverty and exploitation within a liberal capitalist society." On the other hand, democratic socialist is used for left-wing socialist parties, including left-wing populist parties such as The Left, Podemos and Syriza. This is reflected at the European party level, where the centre-left social democratic parties are within the Party of European Socialists and the Progressive Alliance of Socialists and Democrats, while left-wing democratic socialist and communist parties are within the Party of the European Left and the European United Left–Nordic Green Left. Aside from democratic socialism, the latter also includes communist tendencies and communist parties that embrace a left-libertarian form of communism.

According to Steve Ludlam, "the arrival of New Labour signalled an unprecedented and possibly final assault on the party’s democratic socialist tradition, that is to say the tradition of those seeking the transformation of capitalism into socialism by overwhelmingly legislative means. ... It would be a while before some of the party's social democrats—those whose aim is the gradual amelioration of poverty and exploitation within a liberal capitalist society—began to fear the same threat to Labour's egalitarian tradition as the left recognised to its socialist tradition." This was reflected similarly in Labour: A Tale of Two Parties by Hilary Wainwright.

According to Andrew Mathers, Hilary Wainwright's 1987 work Labour: A Tale of Two Parties provided "a different reading which contrasted the 'ameliorative, pragmatic' social democratic tradition expressed principally in the Parliamentary Labour Party with a 'transformative, visionary' democratic socialist tradition associated mainly with the grassroots members engaged closely with extra-parliamentary struggles."

Economics 
Democratic socialists have promoted various different models of socialism and economics, ranging from market socialism, where socially owned enterprises operate in competitive markets and are self-managed by their workforce, to non-market participatory socialism based on decentralised economic planning. Democratic socialism is also committed to a decentralised form of economic planning, where productive units are integrated into a single organisation and organised based on self-management. Eugene V. Debs and Norman Thomas, both United States Presidential candidates for the Socialist Party of America, understood socialism to be an economic system structured upon production for use and social ownership in place of the for-profit system and private ownership of the means of production. Democratic socialists and contemporary proponents of market socialism have argued that rather than socialism itself, the primary reason for the economic shortcomings of Soviet-type economies was command economies. Their administrative-command system caused their failure to create rules and operational criteria for the efficient operation of state enterprises in their hierarchical allocation of resources and commodities and the lack of democracy in the political systems that the Soviet-type economies combined.

Democratic planning 
A democratically planned economy has been proposed as a basis for socialism and variously advocated by some democratic socialists who support a non-market form of socialism whilst rejecting Soviet-type central planning. It has been argued that decentralised planning allows for a spontaneously self-regulating system of stock control, relying solely on calculation in kind, to come about and that in turn decisively overcomes the objections raised by the economic calculation argument that any large-scale economy must necessarily resort to a system of market prices.

This form of economic planning implies some process of democratic and participatory decision-making within the economy and firms in the form of industrial democracy. Various computer scientists and radical economists have also proposed computer-based forms of democratic economic planning and coordination between economic enterprises. Proponents present democratic or decentralized and participatory economic planning as an alternative to market socialism for a post-capitalist society.

Market socialism 
Some proponents of market socialism see it as an economic system compatible with the political ideology of democratic socialism. Advocates of market socialism, such as Jaroslav Vaněk, argue that genuinely free markets are impossible under private ownership of productive property. Vaněk contends that the class differences and unequal distribution of income and economic power that result from private ownership of industry enable the interests of the dominant class to skew the market in their favour, either in the form of monopoly and market power or by utilising their wealth and resources to legislate government policies that benefit their specific business interests. Additionally, Vaněk states that workers in a socialist economy based on cooperative and self-managed enterprises have more substantial incentives to maximise productivity because they would receive a share of the profits based on the overall performance of their enterprise, plus their fixed wage or salary. Many pre-Marx socialists and proto-socialists were fervent anti-capitalists just as they were supporters of the free market, including the British philosopher Thomas Hodgskin, the French mutualist thinker and anarchist philosopher Pierre-Joseph Proudhon and American philosophers Benjamin Tucker and Lysander Spooner, among others. Although capitalism has been commonly conflated with the free market, there is a similar laissez-faire economic theory and system associated with socialism called left-wing laissez-faire to distinguish it from laissez-faire capitalism.

One example of this democratic market socialist tendency is mutualism, a democratic and libertarian socialist theory developed by Proudhon in the 18th century, from which individualist anarchism emerged. Benjamin Tucker is one eminent American individualist anarchist who adopted a laissez-faire socialist system he termed anarchistic socialism as opposed to state socialism. This tradition has been recently associated with contemporary scholars such as Kevin Carson, Gary Chartier, Charles W. Johnson, Samuel Edward Konkin III, Roderick T. Long, Chris Matthew Sciabarra and Brad Spangler, who stress the value of radically free markets, termed freed markets to distinguish them from the common conception which these left-libertarians believe to be riddled with statism and bourgeois privileges.

Sometimes referred to as left-wing market anarchists, proponents of this approach strongly affirm the classical liberal ideas of self-ownership and free markets while maintaining that taken to their logical conclusions, these ideas support anti-capitalist, anti-corporatist, anti-hierarchical and pro-labour positions in economics, anti-imperialism in foreign policy and radically progressive views regarding sociocultural issues such as gender, sexuality and race. Echoing the language of these market socialists, they maintain that radical market anarchism should be seen by its proponents and by others as part of the socialist tradition because of its heritage, emancipatory goals and potential and that market anarchists can and should call themselves socialists. Critics of the free market and laissez-faire, as commonly understood, argue that socialism is fully compatible with a market economy and that a genuinely free-market or laissez-faire system would be anti-capitalist and socialist.

According to its supporters, this would result in the society advocated by democratic socialists, when socialism is not understood as state socialism and conflated with self-described socialist states. The free market and laissez-faire are free from all economic privilege, monopolies and artificial scarcities. This is consistent with the classical economics view that economic rents, i.e. profits generated from a lack of perfect competition, must be reduced or eliminated as much as possible through free competition rather than free from regulation. David McNally, a professor at the University of Houston, has argued in the Marxist tradition that the logic of the market inherently produces social inequality and leads to unequal exchanges, writing that Adam Smith's moral intent and moral philosophy espousing equal exchange were undermined by the practice of the free market he championed as the development of the market economy involved coercion, exploitation and violence that Smith's moral philosophy could not counteract. McNally criticises market socialists for believing in the possibility of fair markets based on equal exchanges to be achieved by purging parasitical elements from the market economy, such as private ownership of the means of production, arguing that market socialism is an oxymoron when socialism is defined as an end to wage labour.

Implementation 
While socialism is commonly used to describe Marxism–Leninism and affiliated states and governments, there have also been several anarchist and socialist societies that followed democratic socialist principles, encompassing anti-authoritarian and democratic anti-capitalism. The most notable historical examples are the Paris Commune, the various soviet republics established in the post-World War I period, early Soviet Russia before the abolition of soviet councils by the Bolsheviks, Revolutionary Catalonia as noted by George Orwell, and the Federation of Rojava in Northern Syria. Other examples include the kibbutz communities in modern-day Israel, Marinaleda in Spain, the Zapatistas of EZLN in the region of Chiapas, and to some extent, the workers' self-management policies within the Socialist Federal Republic of Yugoslavia and Cuba. However, the best-known example is Chile under President Salvador Allende, who was violently overthrown in a military coup funded and backed by the CIA in 1973.

When nationalisation of large industries was relatively widespread during the Keynesian post-war consensus, it was not uncommon for some political commentators to describe several European countries as democratic socialist states seeking to move their countries towards a socialist economy. In 1956, leading British Labour Party politician Anthony Crosland claimed that capitalism had been abolished in Britain. However, others such, as Welshman Aneurin Bevan, Minister of Health in the first post-war Labour government and the architect of the National Health Service, disputed the claim that Britain was a socialist state. For Crosland and others who supported his views, Britain was a socialist state. According to Bevan, Britain had a socialist National Health Service, which opposed the hedonism of Britain's capitalist society. Although the laws of capitalism still operated entirely as in the rest of Europe and private enterprise dominated the economy, several political commentators claimed that during the post-war period, when socialist parties were in power, countries such as Britain and France were democratic socialist states. The same claim is now applied to Nordic countries with the Nordic model. In the 1980s, the government of President François Mitterrand aimed to expand dirigisme by attempting to nationalise all French banks, but this attempt faced opposition from the European Economic Community, which demanded a capitalist free-market economy among its members. Nevertheless, public ownership in France and the United Kingdom during the height of nationalisation in the 1960s and 1970s never accounted for more than 15–20% of capital formation.

The form of socialism practised by parties such as the Singaporean People's Action Party during its first few decades in power was pragmatic, as it its rejection of mass nationalisation characterised it. The party still claimed to be socialist, pointing out its extensive regulation of the private sector, activist intervention in the economy and social welfare policies as evidence of this claim. Singaporean Prime Minister Lee Kuan Yew stated that he had been influenced by the democratic socialist factions of the British Labour Party.

Philosophy 

Democratic socialism involves the entire population controlling the economy through some democratic system, with the idea that the means of production are owned and managed by the working class. The interrelationship between democracy and socialism extends far back into the socialist movement to The Communist Manifesto'''s emphasis on winning as a first step the "battle of democracy", with Karl Marx writing that democracy is "the road to socialism." Socialist thinkers such as Eduard Bernstein, Karl Kautsky, Vladimir Lenin and Rosa Luxemburg wrote that democracy is indispensable to realising socialism. Philosophical support for democratic socialism can be found in the works of political philosophers such as Axel Honneth and Charles Taylor. Honneth has put forward the view that political and economic ideologies have a social basis, meaning they originate from intersubjective communication between members of society. Honneth criticises the liberal state and ideology because it assumes that principles of individual liberty and private property are ahistorical and abstract when they evolved from a specific social discourse on human activity. In contrast to liberal individualism, Honneth has emphasised the intersubjective dependence between humans, namely that human well-being depends on recognising others and being recognised by them. With an emphasis on community and solidarity, democratic socialism can be seen as a way of safeguarding this dependency.

While socialism is frequently used to describe socialist states and Soviet-style economies, especially in the United States due to the First and Second Red Scares, democratic socialists use socialism to refer to the tendency that rejects the ideas of authoritarian socialism and state socialism as socialism, regarding them as a form of state capitalism in which the state undertakes commercial economic activity and where the means of production are organised and managed as state-owned enterprises, including the processes of capital accumulation, centralised management and wage labour. Democratic socialists include those socialists who are opposed to Marxism–Leninism and social democrats who are committed to the abolishment of capitalism in favour of socialism and the institution of a post-capitalist economy. Andrew Lipow thus wrote in 1847 the editors of the Journal of the Communist League, directly influenced by Marx and Friedrich Engels, whom Lipow describes as "the founders of modern revolutionary democratic socialism":

Theoretically and philosophically, socialism itself is democratic, seen as the highest democratic form by its proponents and at one point being the same as democracy. Some argue that socialism implies democracy and that democratic socialism is a redundant term. However, others, such as Michael Harrington, argue that the term democratic socialism is necessary to distinguish it from that of the Soviet Union and other self-declared socialist states. For Harrington, the primary reason for this was the perspective that viewed the Stalinist-era Soviet Union as having succeeded in usurping the legacy of Marxism and distorting it in propaganda to justify its politics. Both Leninism and Marxism–Leninism have emphasised democracy, endorsing some form of democratic organisation of society and the economy whilst supporting democratic centralism, with Marxist–Leninists and others arguing that socialist states such as the Soviet Union were democratic. Marxist–Leninists also tended to distinguish socialist democracy from democratic socialism, which they associated pejoratively with "reformism" and "social democracy." Ultimately, they are considered outside the democratic socialist tradition. On the other hand, anarchism (especially within its social anarchist tradition) and other ultra-left tendencies have been discussed within the democratic socialist tradition for their opposition to Marxism–Leninism and their support for more decentralised, direct forms of democracy.

While both anarchists and ultra-left tendencies have rejected the label as they tend to associate it with reformist and statist forms of democratic socialism, they are considered revolutionary-democratic forms of socialism, and some anarchists have referred to democratic socialism. Some Trotskyist organisations such as the Australian Socialist Alliance, Socialist Alternative and Victorian Socialists or the French New Anticapitalist Party, Revolutionary Communist League and Socialism from below have described their form of socialism as democratic and have emphasised democracy in their revolutionary development of socialism. Similarly, several Trotskyists have emphasised Leon Trotsky's revolutionary-democratic socialism. Some such as Hal Draper spoke of "revolutionary-democratic socialism." Those third camp revolutionary-democratic socialists advocated a socialist political revolution to establish or re-establish socialist democracy in deformed or degenerated workers' states. Draper also compared social democracy and Stalinism as two forms of socialism from above, contraposed to his socialism from below as being the purer, more Marxist version of socialism.

As a political tradition, democratic socialism represents a broad anti-Stalinist leftist and, in some cases, anti-Leninist strand within the socialist movement, including anti-authoritarian socialism from below, libertarian socialism, market socialism, Marxism and certain left communist and ultra-left tendencies such as councilism and communisation as well as classical and libertarian Marxism. It also includes the orthodox Marxism related to Karl Kautsky and Rosa Luxemburg, as well as the revisionism of Eduard Bernstein. In addition, democratic socialism is related to the trend of Eurocommunism originating between the 1950s and 1980s, referring to communist parties that adopted democratic socialism after Nikita Khrushchev's de-Stalinisation in 1956, but also that of most communist parties since the 1990s.

As a related ideology, classical social democracy is a form of democratic socialism. Social democracy underwent various major forms throughout its history and is distinguished between the early trend that supported revolutionary socialism, mainly related to Marx and Engels, as well as other notable social-democratic politicians and orthodox Marxist thinkers such as Bernstein, Kautsky, Luxemburg and Lenin, including more democratic and libertarian interpretations of Leninism; the revisionist trend adopted by Bernstein and other reformist socialist leaders between the 1890s and 1940s; the post-war trend that adopted or endorsed Keynesian welfare capitalism as part of a compromise between capitalism and socialism; and those opposed to the Third Way.

 Views on the compatibility of democracy and socialism 
 Support 
One of the foremost scholars who have argued that socialism and democracy are compatible is the Austrian-born American economist Joseph Schumpeter, who was hostile to socialism. In his book Capitalism, Socialism and Democracy'' (1942), Schumpeter emphasised that "political democracy was thoroughly compatible with socialism in its fullest sense". However, it has been noted that he did not believe that democracy was a sound political system and advocated republican values.

In a 1963 All India Congress Committee address, Indian Prime Minister Jawaharlal Nehru stated: "Political democracy has no meaning if it does not embrace economic democracy. And economic democracy is nothing but socialism."

Political historian Theodore Draper wrote: "I know of no political group which has resisted totalitarianism in all its guises more steadfastly than democratic socialists."

Historian and economist Robert Heilbroner argued that "[t]here is, of course, no conflict between such a socialism and freedom as we have described it; indeed, this conception of socialism is the very epitome of these freedoms", referring to open association of individuals in political and social life; the democratization and humanization of work; and the cultivation of personal talents and creativity.

Bayard Rustin, a long-time member of the Socialist Party of America and National Chairman of the Social Democrats, USA, wrote: "For me, socialism has meaning only if it is democratic. Of the many claimants to socialism only one has a valid title—that socialism which views democracy as valuable per se, which stands for democracy unequivocally, and which continually modifies socialist ideas and programs in the light of democratic experience. This is the socialism of the labor, social-democratic, and socialist parties of Western Europe."

Economist and political theorist Kenneth Arrow argued: "We cannot be sure that the principles of democracy and socialism are compatible until we can observe a viable society following both principles. But there is no convincing evidence or reasoning which would argue that a democratic-socialist movement is inherently self-contradictory. Nor need we fear that gradual moves in the direction of increasing government intervention will lead to an irreversible move to 'serfdom.'"

Journalist William Pfaff wrote: "It might be argued that socialism ineluctably breeds state bureaucracy, which then imposes its own kinds of restrictions upon individual liberties. This is what the Scandinavians complain about. But Italy's champion bureaucracy owes nothing to socialism. American bureaucracy grows as luxuriantly and behaves as officiously as any other."

Opposition 
Some politicians, economists, and theorists have argued that socialism and democracy are incompatible. According to them, history is full of instances of self-declared socialist states that at one point were committed to the values of personal liberty, freedom of speech, freedom of the press and freedom of association but then found themselves clamping down on such freedoms as they end up being viewed as inconvenient or contrary towards their political or economic goals. Chicago School economist Milton Friedman argued that a "society which is socialist cannot also be democratic" in the sense of "guaranteeing individual freedom." Sociologist Robert Nisbet, a philosophical conservative who began his career as a leftist, argued in 1978 that there is "not a single free socialism to be found anywhere in the world."

Neoconservative Irving Kristol argued: "Democratic socialism turns out to be an inherently unstable compound, a contradiction in terms. Every social democratic party, once in power, soon finds itself choosing, at one point after another, between the socialist society it aspires to and the liberal society that lathered it." Kristol added that "socialist movements end up [in] a society where liberty is the property of the state, and is (or is not) doled out to its citizens along with other contingent 'benefits'."

Similarly, anti-communist academic Richard Pipes argued: "The merger of political and economic power implicit in socialism greatly strengthens the ability of the state and its bureaucracy to control the population. Theoretically, this capacity need not be exercised and need not lead to growing domination of the population by the state. In practice, such a tendency is virtually inevitable. For one thing, the socialization of the economy must lead to a numerical growth of the bureaucracy required to administer it, and this process cannot fail to augment the power of the state. For another, socialism leads to a tug of war between the state, bent on enforcing its economic monopoly, and the ordinary citizen, equally determined to evade it; the result is repression and the creation of specialized repressive organs."

See also 

 Democratic capitalism
 Democratic liberalism
 Democratic republic
 Democratic Socialist Party (disambiguation)
 International Group of Democratic Socialists
 List of anti-capitalist and communist parties with national parliamentary representation
 List of social democratic and democratic socialist parties that have governed
 List of democratic socialist parties and organizations
 List of democratic socialists
 List of Labour parties
 List of left-wing political parties
 List of social democratic parties
 List of social democrats
 Millennial socialism
 Popular socialism
 Social Democratic Party
 Socialist Party
 Soviet democracy
 Workers' council

References

Citations

Notes

Sources

Books

Encyclopedias

Journals

News

Speeches

Web

Bibliography

Further reading 

 
 
 
 
 

 
Anti-Stalinist left
Anti-capitalism
Socialism
Economic ideologies
History of socialism
Left-wing ideologies
Liberal socialism
Market socialism
Mixed economies
Social democracy
Socialism
Types of socialism